River Side Farmhouse is a historic farmhouse in Shelbyville, Tennessee, U.S..

History
The land was acquired by John Shofner, a settler from North Carolina, in 1815. Shofner built a loghouse, which was later demolished by his son Michael. A new house was built by Michael Shofner, but it was also demolished thereafter. By 1890, Michael's son, Jacob Morton Shofner, built this farmhouse. Jacob's grandson, Prentice Cooper, was born in this house; he went on to serve as the 39th Governor of Tennessee from 1939 to 1945. The house is still owned by the Cooper family, which includes Congressman Jim Cooper and mayor of Nashville John Cooper.

Architectural significance
The house was designed in the Queen Anne architectural style. It has been listed on the National Register of Historic Places since December 1, 1997.

References

Houses on the National Register of Historic Places in Tennessee
Queen Anne architecture in Tennessee
Houses completed in 1890
National Register of Historic Places in Bedford County, Tennessee
Buildings and structures in Shelbyville, Tennessee
Cooper family